Alan Hurst may refer to:

* Alan Hurst (politician) (1945–2023), British Labour Party Member of Parliament (MP) for Braintree 1997–2005
 Alan Hurst (cricketer) (born 1950), former Australian cricketer